The name Rebecca, or the alternate spelling of the name, Rebekah, has been used for four tropical or Subtropical cyclones worldwide.

In the Atlantic Ocean:
 Subtropical Storm Rebekah (2019) –  a short-lived storm that formed over the far northern Atlantic and passed just north of the Azores.

In the Eastern Pacific Ocean:
 Tropical Storm Rebecca (1961)
 Hurricane Rebecca (1968)

In the Australian region:
 Cyclone Rebecca (1985) – made landfall in Queensland as a Category 1 storm

Pacific hurricane set index articles